California Meeting: Live on Broadway is a live album by the American jazz saxophonist Archie Shepp recorded in 1985 and released on the Italian Soul Note label.

Reception 
The Allmusic review by Scott Yanow awarded the album 3 stars stating "Archie Shepp recordings in the 1980s are hit and miss; this is one of the more interesting ones... Not essential but this CD is worth picking up by Archie Shepp's fans".

Track listing 
 "St. James Infirmary" (Traditional) - 7:20 
 "A Night in Tunisia" (Dizzy Gillespie) - 13:42 
 "Giant Steps" (John Coltrane) - 6:54 
 "My Romance" (Lorenz Hart, Richard Rodgers) - 12:27 
Recorded at The On Broadway Bar & Cafe in Sacramento, California on May 22, 1985

Personnel 
 Archie Shepp – tenor saxophone, soprano saxophone
 George Cables – piano
 Herbie Lewis – bass
 Eddie Marshall – drums
 Royal Blue - vocals (track 1)

References 

Black Saint/Soul Note live albums
Archie Shepp albums
1987 live albums